Year 1579 (MDLXXIX) was a common year starting on Thursday (link will display the full calendar) of the Julian calendar, and a common year starting on Monday of the Proleptic Gregorian calendar.

Events 
 January–June 
 January 6  – The Union of Arras unites the southern Netherlands under the Duke of Parma, governor in the name of king Philip II of Spain.
 January 23 –  The Union of Utrecht unites the northern Netherlands in a confederation called the United Provinces. William I of Orange becomes Stadtholder, and the Duc d'Anjou, younger brother of Henry III of France, is invited to become hereditary sovereign.
 March – Maastricht is captured by the Spanish under Parma.
 May 25 – Battle of Mimaomote: In Japan, Doi Kiyonaga defeats the forces of Kumu Yorinobu.
 June 17 – Francis Drake, during his circumnavigation of the world, lands in modern-day California, which he claims for Queen Elizabeth I. With an English claim here and in Newfoundland, it becomes the basis for English colonial charters which will claim all land from the Atlantic to the Pacific, from "sea to sea." Drake's claim is called Nova Albion (New England), and subsequent maps will show all lands north of New Spain and New Mexico under this name.
 July 16 – James FitzMaurice FitzGerald lands with a small force of Irish, Spanish, and Italian troops at Smerwick, on the Dingle Peninsula in south-western Ireland, and commences the Second Desmond Rebellion against the rule in Ireland of Elizabeth I of England.

 July–December 
 July 13 – Karlovac, Croatia is founded.

 Date unknown 
 Akbar abolishes jizya.
 The municipality of Boac in Marinduque, Philippines is founded.
 The Bible of Kralice begins publication. The first complete translation of the Bible into the Czech language (with notes), it is prepared by the Unity of the Brethren, and published at Kralice nad Oslavou, Bohemia.

Births 

 January 4 – Willem Teellinck, Dutch pastor (d. 1629)
 January 7 – Juan Manuel Pérez de Guzmán, 8th Duke of Medina Sidonia, Spanish nobleman, Knight of the Order of the Golden Fleece (d. 1636)
 January 23 – Marie of Prussia, Margravine of Brandenburg-Bayreuth (d. 1649)
 January 27 – Antonio Tornielli, Italian Catholic prelate who served as Bishop of Novara (1636–1650) (d. 1650)
 February 9 – Johannes Meursius, Dutch classical scholar and antiquary (d. 1639)
 February 24 – Johann Jacob Grasser, Swiss poet, historian and theologian (d. 1627)
 March 23 – Francis Mansell, English academic (d. 1665)
 April 10 – Augustus the Younger, Duke of Brunswick-Lüneburg (d. 1666)
 April 12 – François de Bassompierre, French courtier (d. 1646)
 April 25 – García de Toledo Osorio, 6th Marquis of Villafranca, Spanish noble and politician (d. 1649)
 May 1 – Wolphert Gerretse, Dutch founder of the New Netherland Colony (d. 1662)
 May 2 – Tokugawa Hidetada, Japanese shōgun (d. 1632)
 June 17 – Louis I, Prince of Anhalt-Köthen, German prince (d. 1650)
 June 18 – Afonso Mendes, Patriarch of Ethiopia (d. 1659)
 July 2 – Janusz Radziwiłł, Lithuanian and Polish nobleman (d. 1620)
 July 6
 Bernardino de Almansa Carrión, Spanish Catholic prelate and Archbishop (d. 1633)
 Francis Norris, 1st Earl of Berkshire, English noble (d. 1622)
 July 13 – Arthur Dee, English physician and alchemist (d. 1651)
 August 1 – Luis Vélez de Guevara, Spanish dramatist and novelist (d. 1644)
 August 18 – Countess Charlotte Flandrina of Nassau (d. 1640)
 August 21 – Henri, Duke of Rohan (d. 1638)
 August 23 – Thomas Dempster, Scottish scholar and historian (d. 1625)
 September 1 
 John Frederick of Holstein-Gottorp, Prince-Bishop, German Catholic archbishop (d. 1634)
 Samuel Coster, Dutch writer (d. 1665)
 September 3 – Louis I, Count of Erbach-Erbach (1606–1643) (d. 1643)
 September 17 – Charles Howard, 2nd Earl of Nottingham, English noble (d. 1642)
 October 4 – Guido Bentivoglio, Italian cardinal (d. 1644)
 October 18 – Anthony Abdy, English merchant (d. 1640)
 November 7 – Juan de Peñalosa, Spanish painter (d. 1633)
 November 11 – Frans Snyders, Flemish painter (d. 1657)
 November 12 – Albrecht of Hanau-Münzenberg, German nobleman (d. 1635)
 November 16 – Federico Baldissera Bartolomeo Cornaro, Italian Catholic cardinal (d. 1653)
 December 9 – Martin de Porres, Peruvian monk, Roman Catholic saint (d. 1639)
 December 20 (bapt.) – John Fletcher, English dramatist (d. 1625)
 date unknown
 Jacob Astley, 1st Baron Astley of Reading, royalist commander in the English Civil War (d. 1652)
 Arthur Johnston, Scottish physician and poet (d. 1641)
 John Ogilvie, Scottish Jesuit, Roman Catholic saint (martyred 1615)

Deaths 

 February 5 – Countess Palatine Helena of Simmern, Countess consort of Hanau-Münzenberg (1551-1561) (b. 1532)
 February 16 – Gonzalo Jiménez de Quesada, Spanish explorer (b. 1509)
 February 20 – Nicholas Bacon, English politician (b. 1509)
 March 12 – Alessandro Piccolomini, Italian humanist and philosopher from Siena (b. 1508)
 April 25 – John Stuart, 4th Earl of Atholl
 May 6 – François de Montmorency, French nobleman (b. 1530)
 May 20 – Isabella Markham, English courtier (b. 1527)
 June 17 – Johannes Stadius, German astronomer, astrologer, mathematician (b. 1527)
 June 25 – Hatano Hideharu, Japanese samurai (b. 1541)
 July 3 – Edward Fitton, the elder, Irish politician (b. 1527)
 August 5 – Stanislaus Hosius, Polish Catholic cardinal (b. 1504)
 August 12 – Domenico Bollani, Bishop of Milan (b. 1514)
 October 11 – Sokollu Mehmed Pasha, Turkish Janissary and Grand Vizier (b. 1505)
 October 13 – William Drury, English politician (b. 1527)
 October 21 – Tanegashima Tokitaka, Japanese Daimyo (b. 1528)
 October 24 – Albert V, Duke of Bavaria (b. 1528)
 November 9 – Philip VI, Count of Waldeck (1567–1579) (b. 1551)
 November 15 – Francis David, Hungarian religious reformer (b. 1510)
 November 21 – Thomas Gresham, English merchant and financier (b. 1519)
 date unknown
 Giovanni Battista Adriani, Italian historian (b. c. 1512)
 Diego de Landa, Spanish Bishop of the Yucatán (b. 1524)
 Hieronim Jarosz Sieniawski, Polish noble (b. 1516)
 Barbara Thenn, Austrian merchant and Münzmeister  (b. 1519)
 William Whittingham, English Biblical scholar and religious reformer (b. 1524)
 Voravongsa I, Laotian king of Lan Xang
probable - Hans Staden, German adventurer (b. 1525)

References